William Howell (12 January 1902 – 23 January 1987) was an Australian cricketer. He played fourteen first-class matches for New South Wales between 1932/33 and 1935/36.

See also
 List of New South Wales representative cricketers

References

External links
 

1902 births
1987 deaths
Australian cricketers
New South Wales cricketers
Cricketers from Sydney